Wheatland Baptist Cemetery, also known as Belcoda Cemetery, is a historic cemetery located at Belcoda in the town of Wheatland in Monroe County, New York.  It is the earliest cemetery in the town of Wheatland and contains the graves of many of the earliest settlers and prominent residents of the town.  It contains stones that date from 1811 to the present, ranging from simple carved early stones to more elaborate mid- and late-Victorian monuments.

It was listed on the National Register of Historic Places in 2006.

References

External links

Cemeteries on the National Register of Historic Places in New York (state)
Cemeteries in Monroe County, New York
Baptist cemeteries in the United States
National Register of Historic Places in Monroe County, New York